Gildo Siorpaes (born January 12, 1938 in Cortina d'Ampezzo) is an Italian bobsledder who competed in the early 1960s. He was born in Cortina d'Ampezzo. He won a bronze medal in the four-man event at the 1964 Winter Olympics in Innsbruck.

References

External links
 

1938 births
Bobsledders at the 1964 Winter Olympics
Italian male bobsledders
Living people
Olympic bobsledders of Italy
Olympic bronze medalists for Italy
Olympic medalists in bobsleigh
Medalists at the 1964 Winter Olympics
Italian alpine skiing coaches